Divodāsa ("heaven's servant") is a king in the Rigveda (celebrated for his liberality and protected by Indra and the Ashvins in the Rigveda, RV 1.112.14; 1.116.18), the son of Vadhryashva RV 6.61.5. Further, the Mandala 9 of Rigveda mentions Divodasa thus: "[Indra] Smote swiftly forts, and Sambara, then Yadu and that Turvaga, for pious Divodasa's sake." RV 9.61.2.   

He is the father  of the famous king Sudas (RV 7.18.28) (of the Battle of the Ten Kings). Pijavana is the other name of Divodasa according to Rigveda. His son, Pratardana, is mentioned in the Kaushitaki Upanishad.

He was invited in the Ashwamedha Sacrifice performed by King Dasharatha of Ayodhya. He was the younger brother of Queen Sumitra and was a Brother-in-law of Dasharatha. He was also the son of King Bhimaratha and was a great grandson of Lord Dhanvantari.
It is also the name of a king of Kashi surnamed Dhanvantari as per the hymn (RV 10.179.2), the founder of the Indian school of medicine called Ayurveda.

Genealogy

 Brahma
 Atri
 Chandra
 Budha
 Pururavas
 Ayus
 Anenas
 Pratikṣatra
 Sṛñjaya
 Jaya
 Vijaya
 Kṛti
 Haryaśva
 Sahadeva
 Nadina
 Jayatsena
 Saṃkṛti
 Kṣatradharmā
 Śuhotra
 Śala
 Ārṣṭiṣeṇa
 Kāśa
 Dīrghatapas
 Dhanvantari
 Ketumān
 Bhīmaratha
 Divodāsa.

See also
 Sudas
 Shambara

References

External links
 Divodasa - Disciple of Bhardwaja
 The Dynasties of The sons of King Pururava
 Invitation of Ashwamedha Yagna by King Dasharatha

Rishis
Characters in the Mahabharata
Characters in the Ramayana
Mythological Indian monarchs